The Great Famine (and sometimes known as the Grand Famine) was a period of mass starvation during the Axis occupation of Greece (1941–1944), during World War II. The local population suffered greatly during this period, while the Axis Powers initiated a policy of large-scale plunder. Requisitions, together with the Allied blockade, the ruined state of the country's infrastructure after the German invasion of Greece, and the emergence of a powerful and well-connected black market, resulted in the Great Famine, with the mortality rate reaching a peak during the winter of 1941–42.

The great suffering, and the resulting pressure from the Greek diaspora, eventually forced the Royal Navy to lift the blockade partially. Through the ends of 1941, Kızılay (the Turkish Red Crescent), and from the summer of 1942 the International Red Cross, were able to distribute supplies in sufficient quantities with the help of several foreign and Greece-based humanitarian organizations helping with financial aid and support. The situation remained grim until the end of the Nazi occupation, and continued on a small scale until the end of the war.

Background

Fascist Italy invaded Greece from Albania on 28 October 1940. However, the invasion was quickly turned into a humiliating defeat for the Italians and the Greek forces managed to penetrate deep into Albanian territory. On 6 April 1941, Germany attacked Greece and the Greek forces fell back quickly under the astonishing firepower of the Blitzkrieg. Immediately following their victory, the occupation powers divided the country into 3 zones between which any movement of goods and people was strictly prohibited. The Germans occupied parts of Athens, the region around Thessaloniki, a few strategic outposts in the Aegean and the island of Crete, the Bulgarians held the northern regions of Thrace and Eastern Macedonia, while the Italians controlled most of the mainland and the Ionian Islands.

In general, the Axis powers viewed conquered nations as sources of raw materials, food and labor. As a matter of policy, subjugated nations were to provide material support to Germany and Italy. According to this principle, already from the outset of the occupation, German and Italian troops initiated a policy of wide-scale plunder of everything of value. Moreover, pillage, torture, executions, and civilian massacres throughout Greece were also part of the Axis agenda during the years of occupation. The German attitude toward occupied peoples was expressed succinctly in the words of Hermann Göring in a letter to the Reich commissioners and military commanders of the occupied territories on 6 August 1942:

First months of occupation

Within the occupation zones, the confiscation of fuel and all means of transportation, including fishing boats and pack animals, prevented any transfer of food and other supplies and reduced mobility to a minimum. The occupiers seized strategic industries and appropriated or bought them at low prices, paying with occupation marks they circulated all stocks of commodities like tobacco, olive oil, cotton, and leather and transferred them to their home countries.

Laird Archer, who worked for an American aid agency and was in Athens when the Germans entered the city on 27 April 1941, noted in his Journal:

Unemployment rose to extreme levels, while extraordinary levies were extorted from the Greek collaborationist government to sustain the occupying forces. Occupied Greece was not only burdened with the occupation costs of the German and Italian armies but also with the expenses of Axis military projects in the Eastern Mediterranean. Unlike the rest of the occupied countries, whose costs were limited to their actual defense appropriations prior to the Axis invasion, the size of Greece's levy in 1941–1942 reached 113.7% of the local national income.

On the other hand, the Allied forces responded with a full naval blockade in order to weaken the Axis in its military efforts. This cut off all imports to Greece, including foods.

Farmers in Greece had to pay a 10% in kind tax on their produce and to sell to the collaborationist government at fixed prices all production above the subsistence level. The food price controls and rationing that had been in place before the Greek defeat were now tightened. With the low government prices and newly imposed taxes, farmers went to great lengths to hide their produce from the officials and traders pulled their merchandise from the shelves, a factor that added to the severing of the foreign trade routes on which Greece traditionally depended for food imports. Thus, the scarcity of food supplies resulted in the increase of their prices, while the circulation of the German Occupation Reichsmark and the Italian Casa Mediterranean Drachma led soon to inflation. Under these circumstances, black market and rationing became the only means of food supply in the urban areas of Greece. Fishing was also prohibited, at least during the early period of occupation. Moreover, the Bulgarians forbade any transportation of grain from their zone, where 30% of the Greek pre-war production took place, to the rest of the country.

In mid-September 1941, when the famine was imminent, Berlin responded to enquiries of German officials in Greece:

Under these conditions, and contrary to the rational exploitation of the national resources applied to the occupied countries in Western and Northern Europe, the Germans in Greece resorted to a policy of plunder. Although the collaborationist government under Georgios Tsolakoglou requested from the Axis to import grain before the winter this didn't have any serious impact: Germany and Italy sent a very low amount of grain while Bulgaria sent nothing at all. The few organized efforts by the Orthodox Church and Red Cross were unable to meet the needs of the population.

Determining factors of the food crisis were low food availability and curtailment of communications, partly due to the severe lack of transport facilities but especially because it was imposed on both goods and persons. Other factors were the attempt of the local government and the occupying forces to regulate the market and its prices.

Winter of 1941–1942

The nutritional situation became critical in the summer of 1941 and in the autumn turned into a full-blown famine. Especially in the first winter of occupation (1941–42) food shortage was acute and famine struck especially in the urban centers of the country. Food shortage reached a climax and a famine was unavoidable. During that winter the mortality rate reached a peak, while according to British historian, Mark Mazower, this was the worst famine the Greeks experienced from ancient times. Dead bodies were secretly abandoned in cemeteries or at the streets (possibly so their ration cards could continue to be used by surviving relatives). In other cases, bodies were found days after death. The sight of emaciated dead bodies was commonplace in the streets of Athens.

The situation in Athens and the wider area with its port, Piraeus, was out of control, hyperinflation was in full swing and the price of bread was increased 89-fold from April 1941 to June 1942. According to the records of the German army the mortality rate in Athens alone reached 300 deaths per day during December 1941, while the estimates of the Red Cross were much higher, at 400 deaths while in some days the death toll reached 1,000. Apart from the urban areas the population of the islands was also affected by the famine, especially those living in Mykonos, Syros and Chios.

There are no accurate numbers of the famine deaths because civil registration records did not function during the occupation. In general, it is estimated that Greece suffered approximately 300,000 deaths during the Axis occupation as a result of famine and malnutrition. However, not all parts of Greece experienced equal levels of food scarcity. Although comprehensive data on regional famine severity does not exist, the available evidence indicates that the severe movement restrictions, the proximity to agricultural production and the level of urbanization were crucial factors of famine mortality.

Lifting of the Allied blockade

Britain was initially reluctant to lift the blockade; however, a compromise was reached to allow shipments of grain to come from the neutral Turkey. The first and most significant ship with food supplies that was permitted to supply Greece was the SS Kurtuluş from Turkey, in September 1941. It set its first sail from Istanbul. Foodstuffs were collected by a nationwide campaign of Kızılay (Turkish Red Crescent) and the operation was mainly funded by the Greek-American Greek War Relief Association and the Turkish-Greek Hellenic Union of Constantinopolitans. Initially a total of 50,000 tons of food supplies were planned to be shipped from Turkey; however only 17,500 tons were delivered.

This assistance remained symbolic since one assigned ship alone was unable to alleviate such an extreme situation alone, and considering the state in which the generally limited Turkish economy was in at the time. After colliding with a rock off the coast of Marmara Island due to heavy weather conditions in the Sea of Marmara, SS Kurtuluş was damaged and sank the following the day during her fifth voyage from Istanbul to Piraeus, Athens.

She alone had supplied a total of 6,700 tons of aid during her service in the humanitarian campaign. After it's sinking, Turkey alongside collaborative humanitarian organizations kept aiding Greek humanitarian needs. Ships such as the SS Dumlupınar, SS Tunç, SS Konya, SS Güneysu and SS Aksu maintained and were assigned to part-time suppliance with smaller amount of supplies. One ship, the SS Dumlupınar brought around 1,000 sick Greek children aged 13–16 to Istanbul, to recuperate them in a safe place during the war, later returning them to Greece.

Because of the efforts of the Greek Diaspora in the United States and Great Britain, the situation of the starving civilian population in Greece soon became a public issue in the Allied countries. The increasing public pressure finally led to the lifting of the naval blockade in February 1942. The plan carried under the auspices of the International Red Cross, while Sweden offered to transport 15,000 tons of Canadian wheat. Wheat shipments soon began and together with the rising temperatures of springtime, resulted in the reduction of the mortality rate. At the end of 1942 with the steady supply of sufficient quantities to the country's largest ports, the mortality rate fell, but the food situation remained grim until the end of the occupation (1944).

The international relief was focused mainly on children. In Athens the Red Cross started to provide daily milk rations, medical services and clothing to children younger than two years. In the following March the occupiers and the Allied forces agreed to the establishment of the Swedish-run Joint Relief Commission to reorganize the public food supply system. The occupiers moreover committed to replace all appropriated agricultural products with food imports of equal calorific value and relaxed the harshest mobility restrictions and price regulations.

Nazi bailout plan and the resistance
As the collapse of the Greek monetary system was imminent, the Germans were alarmed that such a possibility would render worthless the flow of drachmas to their troops. In order to deal with this situation, Hermann Neubacher was appointed Reich's special commissioner in Greece. Neubacher's objective was to sustain Axis operation in Greece without destroying the Greek economy. His initiative was eased by the supplies provided by the International Red Cross.

From 1943, large areas of the countryside witnessed reprisal operations, burning of settlements and massive executions by the Germans, like in Epirus and Thessaly. The military operations of the Germans against rural areas, from the rising guerrilla activity, sent large numbers of people into the towns or into the mountains, emptying part of the countryside of its labour force. Famine conditions appeared again during the winter of 1943–44 in Aetolia and some islands. Moreover, the rural population did not receive Red Cross supplies like the cities, either because the Germans retaliated against villages suspected of supporting guerrillas or because they feared that the supplies would fall into the hands of the resistance.  On the other hand, the largest Greek resistance organization, the National Liberation Front (EAM), took the initiative and distributed food and clothing to the regions it controlled at that time.

Impact on literature and thought
In the everyday Greek language the word "occupation" is almost synonymous with famine and hunger due to the harsh situation the Greek population faced during these years. Stockpiling unnecessary amounts of food, and an irrational fear upon seeing an empty pantry, is still colloquially called occupation syndrome by Greek people, since these behaviours were especially common during the postwar years.
 Moreover, various works mention the severe situation faced by the Greek population during the years of occupation. One of these is the novel Zorba the Greek, by Nikos Kazantzakis, which reflected the general danger and starvation of that time.

See also
Siege of Leningrad
Blockade of Germany (1939–1945)
Dutch famine of 1944–1945
Holodomor
SS Kurtuluş

References

Sources

Documents on German Foreign Policy, series D, volume XIII (June 23 - December 11, 1941)

1940s in Greece
1941 in Greece
1942 in Greece
1943 in Greece
1944 in Greece
1941 disasters in Europe
1942 disasters in Europe
1943 disasters in Europe
1944 disasters in Europe
1940s disasters in Europe
Famines in Europe
Economic history of Greece
Axis occupation of Greece
Politics of World War II
Eastern European theatre of World War II
Mediterranean theatre of World War II
Articles containing video clips
20th-century famines
Disasters in Greece
1940s disasters in Greece
1941 disasters in Greece
1942 disasters in Greece
1943 disasters in Greece
1944 disasters in Greece